Tyresö Royal Crowns is a Swedish sports club established in 1990 with American football as its only section. The club currently plays at Tyresövallen in the municipality of Tyresö in the southeastern part of the Stockholm metropolitan area. A one time national champion (2001), the team is currently a contender in Superserien; the first tier of the Swedish football pyramid.

The club also contain several youth sections.

History

Establishment 
The club was founded on March 8, 1990 by high school students Martin Engdahl and Andreas Ehrenreich at Tyresö High School. 98 attendees elected Ehrenreich as first club president.

Grounds 
 2010– Tyresövallen (renaming and renovation of Bollmoravallen)
 2006–2009 Bollmoravallen
 1997–2005 Bollmoravallen/Trollbäckens Idrottsplats (Dalskoleängen, junior teams)
 1990–1997 Centralparken/Fornuddsängen

Club name 
The club elected the name of Royal Crowns by voting. Truckers and Wild Oxen were other popular suggestions.

Per season

Notable import and export players

Youth programs

Under 21 
The club competed with an under 21 team only in one international friendly against the Helsinki Roosters in 2002.

Under 19 
The under 19 is the oldest existing youth program and enjoyed particular success in the seasons 2009–2011 with three back-to-back national championships. The program have played in five national championship games and won three (2011 Solna/Täby 16-15, 2010 Arlanda 24-13, 2018 Arlanda 17-14). 2019 was the first year the club did not field a U19 team, breaking a 26 year streak.

Under 17 
The under 17 program was established after reconstruction of the youth leagues.

Under 16 
The under 16 program was disbanded after the reconstruction of the youth leagues. Until that point the program won one national championship after competing in a total of five national championship games (2003 Ystad 12-6).

Under 15 
The under 15 program was established after reconstruction of the youth leagues.

Under 13 & Under 11 
The programs collectively fall in the category of Pee Wee (Pop Warner) and feature the youngest participants. Tyresö has the oldest Pee Wee program in Sweden playing an inaugural exhibition game August 22 1999.

Flag football 
Flag football was discontinued in the mid-1990s.

School teams 
Some years the club organize games between local middle schools in a tournament known as Karl Holfves Minne, in memory of deceased offensive lineman Karl Holfve.

Rivalries 
While in the lower tiers of the league system, the games against Åkersberga were classic rivalry games. Since Tyresö and Carlstad both entered Superserien in 1998, the two teams have had many fierce battles with the latter most frequently coming out on top. From 2010–2012 the teams faced off in the national championship three years back-to-back with Carlstad as the victors every time.

Among all teams ever in existence in Sweden, there are only three teams with a winning record facing Tyresö; Handelshögskolan(defunct), Carlstad, and Stockholm.

References 
The information in this article is based on that in its Swedish equivalent.

External links 
 Official website

American football teams in Sweden
Sports clubs established in 1990
1990 establishments in Sweden